Dobhi is a large village located in Dobhi Block of the Gaya district in the northeast Indian state of Bihar.

Demographics 
According to the 2011 Population Census, the Dobhi village has a population of 5,741 residents.

Geographical Location 
Dobhi village is found just off the banks of the Falgu River.

Transport
Dobhi village resides at the junction of two national highways: NH 19 (Grand Trunk Road) and NH 22, the latter of which connects to Bodh Gaya, Gaya and Patna; as well as to Jharkhand (a neighbouring state).

Eco Tourism
There is a Bio diversity park named as Buddha Vatika in Dobhi block area, spread over an area of 23 acres. It is located close to Grand Trunk Road(NH-2). This park inhabits all kinds of plant species found in Bihar, particularly those near to extinction due to deforestation.

References

Cities and towns in Gaya district